Divisa  may refer to:
 Divisa, Panama, a town in Azuero Peninsula
 Divisa Alegre, a Brazilian municipality located in the northeast of the state of Minas Gerais
 Divisa Nova, a Brazilian municipality in the state of Minas Gerais
 Da Divisa River, a river of Santa Catarina state in southeastern Brazil
 Salto da Divisa, a Brazilian municipality in the northeast of the state of Minas Gerais